In this article, the results of Al-Nassr FC of Saudi Arabia in 2007-2008 season is summarized

Saudi League

Results

Al-Nasr Standing in 2007-2008 League

King Cup

Quarter-final 
|}
Al Hazm won on penalties shotout.

First leg

Second leg

Crown Prince Cup

Round of 16

Federation Cup

Group stage

Group standing

Semi-final

Final

Under 20 Team

Results

Al-Nasr Standing 

Last Updated 2008-04-28

Under 17 Team

Results

Al-Nasr Standing 

Last Updated 2008-04-28

References 
 kooora.com - Arabic
 goalzz.com - English

Saudi Arabian football clubs 2007–08 season
Al Nassr FC seasons